George Edward Tanner (9 August 1914 – 16 February 1982) was an Australian rules footballer who played with St Kilda in the Victorian Football League (VFL).

Notes

External links 

George Tanner's playing statistics from The VFA Project

1914 births
1982 deaths
Australian rules footballers from Melbourne
St Kilda Football Club players
Port Melbourne Football Club players
People from Balwyn, Victoria